A political gaffe is an error in speech made by a politician.

Definition 
According to Barack Obama it is: 
used by the press to describe any maladroit phrase by a candidate that reveals ignorance, carelessness, fuzzy thinking, insensitivity, malice, boorishness, falsehood, or hypocrisy – or is simply deemed to veer sufficiently far from the conventional wisdom to make said candidate vulnerable to attack.

Kinsley gaffe
A Kinsley gaffe occurs when a political gaffe reveals some truth that a politician did not intend to admit. The term comes from journalist Michael Kinsley, who said, "A gaffe is when a politician tells the truth – some obvious truth he isn't supposed to say."

The term gaffe may be used to describe an inadvertent statement by a politician that the politician believes is true while the politician has not fully analyzed the consequences of publicly stating it. Another definition is a statement made when the politician privately believes it to be true, realizes the dire consequences of saying it, and yet inadvertently utters, in public, the unutterable. Another definition is a politician's statement of what is on their mind—this may or may not be inadvertent—thereby leading to a ritualized 'gaffe dance' between candidates. While exhibiting umbrage or shock, and playing on the mistake, the 'offended candidate' must not exhibit anything resembling glee. A propensity to concentrate on so-called 'gaffes' in campaigns has been criticized as a journalistic device that can lead to distraction from real issues. The Kinsley gaffe is said to be a species of the general 'political gaffe.'

Kinsley himself posed the question: "Why should something a politician says by accident automatically be taken as a better sign of his or her real thinking than something he or she says on purpose?"

Steven Pinker says that politicians use vague and indirect language to avoid making concrete statements, and that lazy journalists base political coverage around "gaffe spotting" rather than analysis of political platforms.

The rise of Internet activism has created a new generation of negative campaigning where a political campaign can create attack ads within an hour of a politician making a gaffe.

See also
 Error#Gaffe
Freudian slip
Hot mic

Footnotes

References

Further reading

Political culture
Politics-related lists